Pietro Lombardi (born 9 June 1992) is a German singer and the winner of season 8 of Deutschland sucht den Superstar. He is best known for his R&B songs and ballads.

Lombardi's songs at Deutschland sucht den Superstar

Personal life

Lombardi's parents are from Italy. He married Sarah Engels, the runner-up of his season, on 1 March 2013. Their son Alessio was born in 2015. In October 2016, the couple announced their divorce. Lombardi is now dating Laura Rypa starting in September 2020.

Discography

Albums

Singles

Featured singles

Other charted songs

References

External links
 Official website 
 Profile on RTL.de 

1992 births
Musicians from Karlsruhe
German people of Italian descent
Deutschland sucht den Superstar winners
21st-century German male singers
German pop singers
Living people
Universal Music Group artists
RTL Group people